The list of University of Oklahoma people includes notable alumni, faculty, and former students of the University of Oklahoma.

Educators
Clinton E. Adams, former medical school dean at Western University of Health Sciences, and current president of Rocky Vista University
Yvonne Chouteau, one of the Five Moons and co-founder of the School of Dance at the University of Oklahoma
Jerry Farley, long-time administrator at OU; 16th president of Washburn University
Alison Fields, Mary Lou Milner Carver Professor of Art of the American West
Julia Gaines, director of the University of Missouri School of Music
Elizabeth Garrett, legal scholar, 13th President of Cornell University
 Barbara Hillyer, founder and first director of the university's Women's Studies program, which was the first of its kind in Oklahoma.
 Leon Quincy Jackson (1926/1927–1995), American architect, professor, and an early African-American architect in Oklahoma and Tennessee.
Ori Kritz Hebrew Professor
Robert L. Lynn, president of Louisiana College in Pineville, Louisiana, 1975–1997; received PhD from Oklahoma
Charles ("Chuck") W. Mooney Jr., the Charles A. Heimbold, Jr. Professor of Law, and former interim Dean, at the University of Pennsylvania Law School
Roger E. Nebergall, Professor of Speech 
James Morton Smith, historian, recipient of a Guggenheim Fellowship (1960), director of Winterthur Museum, Garden and Library (1976–1984) 
Miguel Terekhov, ballet dancer and instructor, co-founder of the School of Dance at the University of Oklahoma
Julie Ann Ward Spanish professor, poet laureate of Norman

Scientists
Howard Bluestein, atmospheric scientist
Gregory Benford, physicist and science fiction writer (also seen in Arts and Entertainment)
James Benford (physicist)
Norman H. Boke, botanist
Frederick Carr, meteorologist
Charles A. Doswell III, meteorologist
Henry T. Lynch, cancer researcher
GA Mansoori, thermodynamic scientist
Paul Markowski, meteorologist
Jens Rud Nielsen, physicist
Erik N. Rasmussen, atmospheric scientist
Neil B. Ward, atmospheric physicist
Christina Warinner, anthropologist
Gladys West, mathematician

Athletes
Vickey Ray Anderson, former professional football player
Dee Andros, former collegiate football coach and Oregon State athletic director
Jason Bartlett, former professional baseball player
Mookie Blaylock, former professional basketball player
Brian Bosworth, former professional football player
Joe Bowden, former professional football player
Anthony Bowie, former professional basketball player
Sam Bradford, professional football player, Heisman winner, most recently a member of the Arizona Cardinals
Donald Brown, former professional football player
 Bill Campbell, American player of gridiron football
Tom Churchill, former Olympic decathlete, football player and multiple sports
Christian Claudio, Puerto Rican National Taekwondo team member
Mark Clayton, former professional football player
Patrick Collins, former professional football player
Bart Conner, former gold medal gymnast
Isaiah Cousins (born 1994), basketball player in the Israeli Basketball Premier League
Stacey Dales, former WNBA player and ESPN analyst, current NFL Network host/reporter
Jack Davis, professional football player
Greg Dobbs, former professional baseball player
Kristian Doolittle (born 1997), basketball player for Hapoel Eilat of the Israeli Basketball Premier League
Roger Eason, former professional football player
Jimmy Edwards, professional football player
Kelly Garrison-Funderburk, former All-American gymnast and 1988 USA Olympian
Harvey Grant, former professional basketball player
Jermaine Gresham, former professional football player
Matt Grice, wrestler; professional Mixed Martial Artist, former UFC Featherweight
Blake Griffin, 1st pick in the 2009 NBA draft to the Los Angeles Clippers
Quentin Griffin, professional football player, currently playing in Europe as of 2013
Jake Hager, current MMA fighter with Bellator and professional wrestler with All Elite Wrestling; former WWE World Heavyweight Champion and WWE United States Champion as Jack Swagger
Todd Hamilton, professional golfer, won The Open Championship in 2004
Tommie Harris, former professional football player
Mickey Hatcher, former professional baseball player and coach
Ray Hayward, Major League Baseball pitcher
Josh Heupel, football player, current head coach of the UCF Golden Knights
Victor Hicks, former professional football player
Buddy Hield, 6th pick in the 2016 NBA draft by the New Orleans Pelicans
Cowboy Hill, professional football player
Danny Hodge, former All-American wrestler and pro wrestler
Jonathan Horton, former All-American gymnast and current USA Olympian
Randy Hughes, former professional football player
Demontre Hurst, NFL player
Clint Ingram, professional football player
Keith Jackson, former professional football player
Jack Jacobs, football player, popularized the forward pass
Ed Jeffers, former professional football player
Bob Kalsu, former professional football player, killed in action as a US Army Artillery officer in Vietnam
Anthony Kim, professional golfer
Bobby Kimball, former professional football player
Stacey King, former professional basketball player
Jim Mankins, former professional football player
Rod Manuel, former professional football player
Baker Mayfield, professional football player
Gerald McCoy, football player, currently a free agent
Wahoo McDaniel, former professional wrestler and football player
Tommy McDonald, former professional football player and NFL hall of fame member
Russ McGinnis, former professional baseball player
Lee Morris, former professional football player
DeMarco Murray, former professional football player who is now the running backs coach of the Oklahoma Sooners football team.
Kyler Murray, quarterback for the Arizona Cardinals of the National Football League, 9th overall draft pick in the 2018 MLB Draft
Eduardo Nájera, former professional basketball player, currently a scout for the Dallas Mavericks
Ralph Neely, former professional football player
sheldon Neuse, professional baseball player
Fred Nixon, former professional football player
Greg Norton, former professional baseball player
Rashard Odomes (born 1996), basketball player in the Israeli Basketball Premier League
Russ Ortiz, professional baseball player
Romero Osby (born 1990), American basketball player who last played for Maccabi Kiryat Gat of the Israeli Basketball Premier League
Milton Overton, Athletic Director, Kennesaw State University
Steve Owens, former professional football player and Heisman Trophy winner
Ashley Paris, professional basketball player
Courtney Paris, professional basketball player
Lindy Pearson, former professional football player
Adrian Peterson, professional football player, currently with the Detroit Lions
Hollis Price, professional basketball player
Clifford Ray, basketball coach and former professional basketball player
Jimmy Rogers, professional football player
Ryan Rohlinger, former professional baseball player
Jason Rouser, Olympic gold medalist, track and field 
Darrell Royal, football player who became a highly successful coach at the University of Texas at Austin
Dave Schultz, 3x NCAA Champion, Olympic and world champion wrestler
Mark Schultz, 3x NCAA Champion, Olympic and world champion wrestler
Lee Roy Selmon, former professional football player and NFL Hall of Fame member
Steve Sewell, former professional football player
Larry Sherrer, former professional football player
Joe Simpson, former professional baseball player and current Atlanta Braves broadcaster
Travis Simpson, former professional football player
Billy Sims, former professional football player
Burch Smith, Major League Baseball player; free agent
Terry Stotts, Head Coach of the Portland Trail Blazers
Evan Tanner, former mixed martial artist who won the UFC Middleweight Championship in 2005
TaShawn Thomas (born 1993), basketball player in the Israeli Premier League
Spencer Tillman, former professional football player; National Champion, Super Bowl Champion San Francisco 49ers; sports analyst
Wayman Tisdale, former professional basketball player
Frank Trigg, MMA fighter and broadcaster
Jerry Tubbs, former professional football player
Richard Turner, former professional football player
Casey Walker, NFL player
Willie Warren, basketball player
Joe Washington, former professional football player
Elbert Watts, former professional football player
J.C. Watts, former professional football player and former member of the U.S. House of Representatives
Jason White, former football player, Heisman Trophy winner
Roy Williams, former professional football player
Trent Williams, football player, currently a member of the San Francisco 49ers
Reggie Willits, former professional baseball player, first base coach of the New York Yankees
Chet Winters, former professional football player
J. T. Wise, former professional baseball player
Bobby Witt, former professional baseball player
Trae Young, professional basketball player for the Atlanta Hawks
Waddy Young, professional football player, killed in action as a US Army Air Force bomber pilot in World War II

Arts and entertainment
Brent Albright, professional wrestler, former NWA World Heavyweight Champion
Alpharad, YouTuber, Esports personality, and musician
Marilyn Artus, visual artist
Gregory Benford, science fiction author and physicist, B.S. Physics, 1963
Jennifer Berry, Miss America 2006
Robert O'Neil Bristow, award-winning author
Jim Butcher, award-winning author
C. J. Cherryh, science fiction and fantasy author, B.A. Latin, 1964
Kellie Coffey, country music singer
Stephen Dickson, opera singer
Larry Drake, television and film actor
Ronnie Claire Edwards, actress
James Garner, film actor and director
David Gates, musician and lead singer for Bread
Jim George, author
Alice Ghostley, actress
Sterlin Harjo, filmmaker
Ed Harris, film actor and director
Van Heflin, film and theater actor
Robert Henson, journalist and author
Adrianna Hicks, actress
Rance Howard, actor
Olinka Hrdy, artist, 1928
Kevin James (undergraduate), radio show host and lawyer
Honorée Fanonne Jeffers, poet and novelist
Christian Kane, actor, musician, singer-songwriter
Roberta Knie, opera singer
Marvin Lamb, composer
D.L. Lang, poet laureate of Vallejo, California
Carol Littleton, film editor
Kirstin Maldonado, soprano in the a capella band "Pentatonix"
Kelly Mantle, drag queen and actor 
Travis McElroy, co-host and co-creator of The Adventure Zone and My Brother, My Brother, and Me
Elizabeth Bauer Mock, modern architecture advocate, professor of architecture 
Mickey Muennig (1935–2021), architect 
Olivia Munn, actress (The Newsroom), model, spokesperson, and former G4 host
Jason Nelson, pioneering net artist and digital poet, 1993
Tom Paxton, singer-songwriter, B.F.A., 1959
Meg Randall, actress
Slim Richey, jazz guitarist
G. Patrick Riley, mask maker and art educator
Kevin Samuels, YouTuber 
Matt Villines (2000), film director (Funny or Die, Saturday Night Live)
"Cowboy" Bill Watts, former professional wrestler
Dennis Weaver, Emmy Award-winning actor
"Dr. Death" Steve Williams, former All-American offensive lineman and popular pro wrestler, especially in Japan

Law
Vaughn Ary, first United States Marine Corps Judge Advocate Division Major General, J.D., 1987
Robert E. Bacharach, Judge of the United States Court of Appeals for the Tenth Circuit, B.A., 1981
Tom Colbert, Chief Justice of the Supreme Court of Oklahoma, first African-American Oklahoma Supreme Court Justice, J.D., 1982
Noma Gurich, Justice of the Supreme Court of Oklahoma, J.D., 1978
Rudolph Hargrave, former Justice of the Supreme Court of Oklahoma, J.D., 1949
Robert Harlan Henry, Judge of the United States Court of Appeals for the Tenth Circuit, former Oklahoma Attorney General, B.A., 1974, J.D., 1976
Anita Hill, OU Law professor and accuser in the Clarence Thomas scandal
Ralph B. Hodges, former Justice of the Supreme Court of Oklahoma, J.D., 1954
William Judson Holloway Jr., Judge of the United States Court of Appeals for the Tenth Circuit, B.A., 1947
Alfred P. Murrah, Judge of the United States Court of Appeals for the Tenth Circuit, namesake of the Alfred P. Murrah Federal Building, LL.B., 1928
Steven W. Taylor, Justice of the Supreme Court of Oklahoma, J.D., 1974
James R. Winchester, Justice of the Supreme Court of Oklahoma, B. A., 1974

Politics
Carl Albert, former Speaker of the U.S. House of Representatives (D-OK), B.A. Political Science, 1927
Dick Armey, former U.S. House Majority Leader (R-TX), PhD Economics
Jari Askins, former Lieutenant Governor of Oklahoma, B.A. Journalism, 1975; J.D., 1980
Dan Boren, former congressman (D-OK), M.B.A., 2000
David Boren, former Governor of Oklahoma and U.S. Senator (D-OK); former President of the University of Oklahoma, J.D., 1968
Brad Carson, former Congressman (D-OK), J.D. 1994
Fernando Chui Sai On, current Chief Executive and the former Secretary for Social and Cultural Affairs of the Macau Special Administrative Region of the People's Republic of China, PhD Public Health
Tom Coburn, former U.S. Senator and Congressman (R-OK), M.D., 1983
Tom Cole, Congressman (R-OK), PhD British History, 1984
Mick Cornett, former Mayor of Oklahoma City
David Hall, former Governor of Oklahoma
Brad Henry, former Governor of Oklahoma (D), B.A. Economics, 1985, J.D., 1988
Wayne Harold Johnson (Master of Library Science), member of both houses, respectively, of the Wyoming State Legislature from Cheyenne, 1993 to 2017 (R)
Frank Keating, former Governor of Oklahoma (R), J.D., 1969
Robert H. Kittleman, Maryland State Senator, 1947
Jess Larson, U.S. Air Force Major General and first administrator of the General Services Administration
Peter MacDonald, Navajo Code Talker, 7th Chairman of the Navajo Nation
Susana Martinez, Governor of New Mexico (R), first Latina governor in the U.S.; J.D. 1986
Dave McCurdy, former Congressman (D-OK)
Scott Meacham, former State Treasurer of Oklahoma
Ruth Messinger, former President of the Borough of Manhattan
Frank Spooner, Louisiana businessman and Republican politician, B.S., 1960 
Rob Standridge, Oklahoma state senator (R), Bachelor's Pharmacy, 1993
David Walters, former Governor of Oklahoma (D), B.S. Industrial Engineering, 1973
J. C. Watts, former U.S. Representative who was the chairman of the House Republican Conference (R-OK), B.A. Journalism, 1981

Others 

Leila Andrews (1876–1954), physician, associate professor of medicine at OU College of Medicine (1910–1925)
Kevin Bales, founder of Free the Slaves
Harry W. Bass, Sr. (1895–1970), American oilman and philanthropist
Clay Bennett, majority owner of the Oklahoma City Thunder
Pat Bowlen, owner of the Denver Broncos (deceased)
Roger Brady, Air Force General
Phillip T. Butler POW in North Vietnam, president of Veterans for Peace
Mike Davis, anthropologist, archeologist, and boat builder
Angie Debo, historian of Oklahoma and Native Americans, A.B. History 1918, PhD 1933
Jordan Deschamps-Braly, maxillofacial surgeon
Archie W. Dunham, oil and gas CEO
Bob Faith (born 1963/1964), founder, chairman and CEO of Greystar Real Estate Partners
Roy Furr, founder of Furr's grocery store and cafeteria chain
Owen K. Garriott, Skylab 3 and STS-9 astronaut, B.S. Electrical Engineering, 1953
Walter E. Gaskin, Lieutenant General United States Marine Corps
Fred Haise, Apollo 13 astronaut, B.S. Aeronautical Engineering, 1959
Thomas J. Haynes, Air National Guard general
Joshua Landis, director of the Center for Middle East Studies at the University of Oklahoma
Anna Lewis (1885–1961), historian, writer, PhD 1930
Tom Love, owner, founder, and chairman of Love's Travel Stops & Country Stores (dropped out)
Shannon Lucid, astronaut, PhD Biochemistry, 1973
Kelli Masters, lawyer and sports agent
Rodney McKinley, 15th Chief Master Sergeant of the Air Force
Larry Merchant, sportswriter and commentator for HBO Sports
Dari Nowkhah, lead anchor for ESPNU
Lotsee Patterson, librarian, educator, and founder of the American Indian Library Association
Ross Porter, broadcaster for the Los Angeles Dodgers
Michael F. Price, mutual fund investor
Mark M. Ravitch, surgeon
Lawrence G. Rawl, Chairman and CEO of Exxon
Gary Michael Rose, 1989, U.S. Army captain, Medal of Honor Recipient, Vietnam War 1970
Jeffrey D. Sadow, political scientist, conservative columnist
Charles Schusterman (1945–2000), businessman, philanthropist
Randall L. Stephenson, chairman and CEO of AT&T
Susan Stryker, professor, author, filmmaker, director of the University of Arizona's Institute of LGBT Studies
Reed Timmer, meteorologist and storm chaser
Helen Walton, widow of Sam Walton
William C. Wantland, Bishop of the Episcopal Diocese of Eau Claire

References

University of Oklahoma people
University of Oklahoma